St Moritz Penthouse and Residences is an integrated development, which consists of six apartment towers, office Tower, five star hotel (JW Marriot), 2 shopping centers, school, hospital, country club and convention center, located at Kembangan, West Jakarta, Indonesia. The six apartment towers and Lippo Office Tower are integrated with Lippo Mall Puri.

Lippo Mall Puri
Tenants in Lippo Mall Puri include: Sogo Department Store, Matahari Department Store, Cinema XXI, Zara, Adidas, Cotton On, Marks & Spencer, H & M, Stradivarius, Adelle Jewellery, Victoria's Secret, Uniqlo, Starbucks, and others.

PX Pavilion @ St. Moritz
PX Pavilion @ The St. Moritz is a lifestyle and entertainment center. It has a 1000-square-meter Grand Ballroom that can accommodate major events such as weddings, exhibitions, seminars, corporate functions, shooting movies, concerts, debates, product launching, birthdays, auctions and lifestyle events.

See also

List of shopping malls in Jakarta
Kembangan

References

Shopping malls in Jakarta
Residential skyscrapers in Indonesia
Skyscraper office buildings in Indonesia
Buildings and structures in Jakarta
Post-independence architecture of Indonesia
West Jakarta